Ameen Ali al-Akimi (born 1959) is a Yemeni politician and MP. On 15 August 2016, he was appointed by Abdrabbuh Mansur Hadi as governor of Al-Jawf Governorate until 10 October 2022 when he was replaced with Hussein al-Aji al-Awadhi.

Career 

 Member of Parliament for three consecutive terms, for constituency No. (276) in Al-Jawf Governorate.
 Commander of the Border Guard battalions, and was promoted to the rank of colonel in 1994.
 Head of the Bakil Tribal Council, 2010.
 Commander of the Al-Nasr Brigade in Al-Jawf Governorate, and was promoted to the rank of brigadier general in 2015.
 Governor of Al-Jawf Governorate on August 15, 2016.
 Commander of the "Al-Jawf Axis", in addition to his work as governor of the governorate, and was promoted to the rank of the major general on July 7, 2018.

References 

Members of the House of Representatives (Yemen)
Yemeni politicians
People from Al Jawf Governorate
Living people
Governors of Al Jawf
1959 births